Musicians known for circular breathing

This is a skill required for the playing of certain instruments. The list is therefore of musicians who are exceptional because of this skill not obligatory in their field.

 Sharon Bezaly – classical flautist
 Anthony Braxton – American saxophonist and composer
 Paul Butterfield – American Classic Rock Harmonica Player
 Harry Carney, baritone saxophonist and clarinetist, prominent member of the Duke Ellington Orchestra
 James Carter – American jazz musician
 Stuart Dempster –  trombonist, didjeridu player, improvisor, and composer
 Amy Dickson – saxophonist from Australia 
 Bora Dugic – Serbian flautist and composer
Wilton Felder – jazz saxophonist for The Crusaders
 Maynard Ferguson – jazz trumpet and flugelhorn player and educator.
 Martin Fröst – Swedish clarinetist
 Kenny G – American smooth jazz saxophonist
 Daniel Goode – avant-garde clarinetist
 Rahsaan Roland Kirk – jazz multi-instrumentalist
 Femi Kuti – Nigerian foremost Afrobeat saxophonist, trumpeter, singer and human rights advocate during his concerts and while setting the record for longest note played on the saxophone
 Wynton Marsalis – American jazz and classical trumpeter
 Irvin Mayfield – Grammy Award-nominated jazz trumpeter, composer and cultural ambassador to New Orleans
 Rafael Méndez – Mexican virtuoso solo trumpeter
 Roscoe Mitchell – jazz multi-instrumentalist
 David Murray – plays tenor saxophone and, on occasion, bass clarinet
 Sergei Nakariakov – classical trumpeter 
 Sam Newsome – American jazz soprano saxophonist
 Evan Parker – free improvising saxophonist noted for his lengthy circular breathing excursions on soprano and tenor saxophones
Jonah Parzen-Johnson – baritone saxophonist and composer.
 Lenny Pickett – American jazz multi-instrumentalist, tenor saxophonist and musical director for the Saturday Night Live Band, former member of Tower of Power
 Courtney Pine – jazz saxophonist e.g. on "Modern Day Jazz Stories" album.
 Sonny Rollins – American jazz musician
 Ned Rothenberg – multi-instrumentalist
 Eugene Rousseau – classical saxophonist
 Xavier Rudd – modern one-man band
 Colin Stetson – saxophonist and multi-instrumentalist 
 Trombone Shorty (Troy Andrews) – trombonist and trumpeter
 Theodosii Spassov – Bulgarian kaval performer and composer
 Idrees Sulieman – jazz trumpeter e.g. on "Hawk Flies High" album.
 John Surman – jazz multiinstrumentalist, mostly on saxes and clarinets, on "Cloud Line Blue" and other albums.
 Clark Terry – jazz trumpet and flugelhorn player and educator. Author of Clark Terry's System of Circular Breathing (1976).
 Ken Vandermark - American jazz saxophonist and clarinettist
 David S. Ware – American jazz musician
 John Zorn – American avant-garde composer, arranger, producer, saxophonist and multi-instrumentalist

References 

Lists of musicians
Circular breathing